Sartoria is a genus of flowering plants in the legume family, Fabaceae.  It belongs to the subfamily Faboideae.

References

Hedysareae
Fabaceae genera